William Edward Felix Hodgman (born 20 April 1969) is an Australian diplomat and former politician who has been the High Commissioner of Australia to Singapore since February 2021. He was the 45th Premier of Tasmania and a member for the Division of Franklin in the Tasmanian House of Assembly from the 2002 state election until his resignation in January 2020. He became premier following the 2014 state election, having been Leader of the Opposition since 2006. He was re-elected to a second term in government following victory in the 2018 state election. 

In March 2018, he succeeded Angus Bethune as the longest-serving leader in the history of the Tasmanian Liberals. He resigned as the Premier of Tasmania, the Leader of the Tasmanian Liberals and Member of the Parliament of Tasmania on 20 January 2020. In April 2020, Hodgman was appointed as the chair of Australian Business Growth Fund by federal Treasurer Josh Frydenberg. Hodgman is from Hobart and was educated at the University of Tasmania.

Hodgman's father, uncle, and grandfather also served in the Parliament of Tasmania.

Early life and education
Hodgman was born in April 1969, the son of former Liberal parliamentarian Michael Hodgman. His uncle, Peter, was also a Member of the Tasmanian Parliament, and his paternal grandfather, Bill Hodgman, was a member of both Houses of the Tasmanian Parliament, ending his career as President of the Legislative Council.

He was educated at The Hutchins School and the University of Tasmania, where he graduated with a Bachelor of Arts and a Bachelor of Laws in 1993, and a Graduate Certificate in Legal Practice in 1994.

Family
He is married to Nicola, and the couple have two sons, William and James, and a daughter, Lily.

Legal career

Hodgman was admitted as a Barrister and Solicitor in 1994. He was an associate of the Hobart law firm Wallace Wilkinson & Webster, before practising as a solicitor for the Wiltshire County Council in the UK for 15 months. 

In the UK, he acted as prosecutor and advocate for the Council in the County Courts and the High Court of Justice. He then returned to Wallace Wilkinson & Webster in 1998, and practised in criminal law and personal injuries until his election to Parliament.

Political career
Hodgman entered Parliament at the 2002 election in the electorate of Franklin and was elected to the role of deputy leader immediately afterwards. He was elected alongside his father, who was elected in the neighbouring seat of Denison.

Hodgman was re-elected in the 2006 election receiving 21.98 per cent of first preferences, an increase compared to his previous vote of 12.37 per cent in the 2002 election. This is the third highest individual vote ever recorded in the seat of Franklin.

On 30 March 2006 he was unanimously elected as the leader of Tasmania's Liberal Party, replacing Rene Hidding following disappointing results at the 2006 election. Jeremy Rockliff is his deputy.

At the 2018 election Hodgman personally received 27,184 first preference votes, the highest number ever for any candidate in a state election in Tasmania.

Hodgman is Tasmania's seventh longest serving Premier. As well as serving as Premier, Hodgman has been Tasmania's Attorney General, Minister for Justice, Minister for Tourism, Hospitality and Events, Minister for Trade, Minister for Parks, Minister for Heritage, Minister for Aboriginal Affairs, Minister for the Arts, Minister for Sport and Recreation, Minister for the Prevention of Family Violence and Minister for Advanced Manufacturing and Defence Industries.

Hodgman held a number of shadow portfolios in his parliamentary career, including Treasury and Finance, Energy, Major Projects and Community Development, Tourism, Economic Development and the Arts.

2010 election 
Hodgman contested the 2010 Tasmanian state election and the result was a hung parliament, with the Liberals and Labor on 10 seats each. The balance of power rested with the Tasmanian Greens, who won five seats. Before the election, the incumbent Premier David Bartlett stated that the party who won the most votes should form government. Since the Liberals won the popular vote by just over 6,700 votes, Bartlett and his caucus voted to give up power, and Bartlett advised the Governor of Tasmania, Peter Underwood, to invite Hodgman to form a government.

However, Hodgman never approached the Greens before the writs were returned, and Bartlett did not promise a Hodgman minority government would have a minimum period of support. Faced with the prospect of a government being defeated at its first sitting, Underwood recommissioned Bartlett as premier and left it to the Assembly to determine whether Labor had enough support to govern. Hodgman accused Bartlett of going back on a promise not to topple a Liberal minority government.

2014 election 
Before the 2014 Tasmanian state election, with polls suggesting the Liberals were positioned to win government, Hodgman had promised that he would only govern in majority.  ABC News election analyst Antony Green suggested Hodgman's promise could have come back to haunt him if the Palmer United Party, which made a significant effort in the election, were to siphon off enough votes to deny the Liberals a majority. 

On election night, Hodgman led the Liberal Party to victory with a swing of over 9% against the incumbent Labor Party. The Liberals picked up an additional seat in every electorate except Denison, assuring that Hodgman would have a secure majority. They ultimately went on to win 15 seats–a comprehensive victory under current Tasmanian electoral practice.

Hodgman himself topped the poll in Franklin, tallying 23,589 first preference votes on 35 percent of the first preference vote; the total number of electors in Franklin is 74,189. This result was achieved despite competing against both Giddings and Greens leader Nick McKim in this multi-member electorate. Hodgman was sworn in as the 45th Premier of Tasmania, alongside the members of his cabinet, on 31 March 2014, becoming only the fifth non-Labor premier in 80 years and only the third to govern in majority.

2018 election 
Hodgman dissolved the parliament and called the election for March 3. Repeating his vow of four years earlier, Hodgman categorically ruled out governing in coalition or minority, saying, "We will govern alone or not at all." However it was thought unlikely at the time that the Liberals would keep their majority due to the strong polling of the Greens and the Jacqui Lambie Network.

During the campaign, Hodgman and the Liberals promised to keep poker machines in pubs and clubs. He claimed 5000 jobs were at risk if machines were banned, although fact checkers called this claim overblown. It was later disclosed that the gambling industry funded his campaign with over $400,000, although the true amount was speculated to be far higher.

The day before the election it was revealed that the Liberals had privately indicated to farming stakeholders they might relax the state's gun laws. The move was criticised by some opponents.

Ultimately, the Liberals suffered a swing of two seats, leaving them at 13 seats, just enough for a majority. It was only the second time in 87 years that the non-Labor forces in Tasmania had been reelected with an outright majority.
Hodgman personally received 27,184 first preference votes, which is the highest number ever in a Tasmanian state election.

On 14 January 2020, Hodgman announced his resignation as premier, and confirmed he would also resign from state parliament. In his resignation speech, he cited the toll on his family; his 17 years in the legislature had been concurrent with the "entire lives" of his three children. On 20 January, Treasurer Peter Gutwein was elected unopposed as Liberal leader, and was sworn in as premier later that day. 

Hodgman is one of the few Australian state politicians to have never spent a day on the backbench. He spent his entire tenure in the House of Assembly as deputy opposition leader (2002–2006), opposition leader (2006–2014) and premier (2014–2020).

Prior to his resignation there was speculation that Hodgman would stay on as premier to surpass Robin Gray as the state's longest serving Liberal Premier.

Career after politics 
On 15 April 2020, Hodgman was announced as the inaugural chair of the new Australian Business Growth Fund.

In November 2020, Hodgman was appointed the next Australian High Commissioner to Singapore. He officially took up the position on 9 February 2021 when he presented his credentials to the President of Singapore Halimah Yacob.

References

External links
Will Hodgman's maiden speech to parliament

1969 births
Living people
Premiers of Tasmania
Leaders of the Opposition in Tasmania
Members of the Tasmanian House of Assembly
Liberal Party of Australia members of the Parliament of Tasmania
University of Tasmania alumni
Politicians from Hobart
Australian people of English descent
21st-century Australian politicians
Attorneys-General of Tasmania